Nothobranchius chochamandai is a species of seasonal killifish in the family Nothobranchiidae. This species is endemic to south-eastern Democratic Republic of Congo. It is known only from the area of the type locality - ephemeral marshes of the Kinikabwimba River, a tributary of Lufutishi River in the middle Luapula River drainage.

Sources

Links
 Nothobranchius chochamandai on WildNothos

chochamandai
Fish described in 2014
Fish of the Democratic Republic of the Congo